El Nuevo Heraldo is a Spanish-language newspaper in Brownsville, Texas, United States. It is a sister newspaper to The Brownsville Herald. In 2009 the 2009 Texas Associated Press Managing Editors' annual meeting awarded the El Nuevo Heraldo as the best Spanish-language newspaper in the state.

References

External links
 El Nuevo Heraldo 

Brownsville, Texas
Spanish-language newspapers published in Texas